Semyonovka is a rural locality (a village) in Karachevsky District, Bryansk Oblast, Russia. The population was 7 as of 2010. There is 1 street.

Geography 
Semyonovka is located 23 km southeast of Karachev (the district's administrative centre) by road. Dunayevsky is the nearest rural locality.

References 

Rural localities in Karachevsky District